Innovations for Learning is a global nonprofit organization dedicated to improving the literacy of children attending under-resourced schools. It has stated it is grounded in the belief that learning to read is a basic civil right with the power to transform lives.  Founded by Seth Weinberger in 1993, the philanthropically supported initiative has focused on beginning reading among the poorest children.

Background
Seth Weinberger launched Innovations for Learning, based in the city of Evanston, in 1993 while a lawyer at the Mayer Brown law firm. He and his wife, Barbara Goodman, a librarian, found the Cherry Preschool with several other families the year before. Learning to program as he continued to build his law career, Weinberger began developing educational software.   The first three software games were licensed to an educational publisher that helped Innovations for Learning grow in prominence.  By 2009, he left his law practice to focus on continuing to expand Innovations for Learning.

TutorMate
Work on virtual volunteering with the TutorMate enrichment program started in Chicago before expanding to New York City and Detroit by 2012.  Supporting corporate social responsibility (CSR) initiatives and equity and inclusion in education, prominent companies and organizations from around the globe have launched virtual workplace volunteering online with TutorMate, including employees from General Motors, Chase Bank, Comerica Bank, Quicken Loans, and DTE Energy. Workplace volunteers e-mentor students as part of an optimal educational experience by tutoring over the Internet and phone from their office during business hours.

Volunteers who have completed required training meet online weekly for 30 minutes with assigned students.  Together, they engage with virtual activities that build fluency, comprehension, phonics, and spelling skills.

Targeting schools where a high percentage of students come from low-income families according to the federal Title 1 program, TutorMate's ongoing expansion into Seattle was supported with funding from Partners of '63, a philanthropic group of Harvard Business School graduates during their 2012 annual meeting in Seattle.

Educational research concluded students achieved greater gains the more they participated with TutorMate's reading volunteers. According to a study in the United States, students who received at least twenty tutoring sessions with volunteers online gained more than three reading levels compared to those who received less than five sessions. Research from the National Literacy Trust in the United Kingdom found that participating students increased on average by 3.2 reading levels.   Phonics scores also increased by an average of 9.3 points.

TeacherMate
First introduced as a handheld device in 2008 to twelve Chicago schools, TeacherMate was used in 500 schools in 14 states by the fall of 2009.  Used by more than 40,000 students, TeacherMate included educational software that covered basic math, reading, vocabulary, and spelling.  Running full-color Flash games, teachers could download student records, generate reports, and set precise skills and levels that were synced with the reading and math curricula used in the school, including spelling words.

A partnership with Stanford University led by Paul Kim from the Stanford Graduate School of Education launched international pilot programs with the device in countries including Mexico, Korea, and the Philippines.  A pilot study of the TeacherMate program tripled the literacy test results of teachers in Rwanda.  Another  pilot program in four Washington, D.C. schools generated results with more than 49% of students passing benchmark scores after one year of the introduction of TeacherMate, an increase from 16%.  A study by the University of Illinois Chicago of 176 first grade classrooms in the Chicago Public Schools found that students who used TeacherMate performed higher on end-of-year reading tests in three categories than those who did not engage with TeacherMate.

The transition from hardware to an app available on iOS devices continued Innovations for Learning's growth into more schools. Miami-Dade County Public Schools implemented the downloadable reading program with the iPod Touch to about 600 students in 2012 after an initial pilot in some of the district's classrooms the previous year. Activities focused on improving phonics, comprehension, vocabulary, and reading fluency while the program combined teaching, tutoring, and technology.

High dosage tutoring
Helping schools scale up high dosage tutoring for early reading in the United States and Canada, Innovations for Learning provides specially trained Early Literacy Interventionists (ELIs) who work one-to-one with students three to five times per week during the school day,  Innovations for Learning has helped schools implement high dosage tutoring in and around Chicago, Seattle, Indianapolis, and Columbus, as well as the sixth largest school district in the United States, Broward County Public Schools.

Innovations for Learning hires and trains qualified paraprofessionals who conference with students in the classroom. Guided by philanthropically supported technology, including devices and proprietary software, interventionists conference with each student for about five minutes. They assess each learner's needs and develop phonics-focused targeted instruction.

According to a study on the impact of high dosage tutoring with interventionists from Innovations for Learning, a greater percentage of early learners who received one-to-one tutoring: outperformed those who were not tutored on an assessment measuring emergent reading proficiency, demonstrated a significantly higher rate of progression in their reading, and achieved grade level proficiency.

Global reach
Expanding operations to the United Kingdom with support from the British global asset management group Janus Henderson, the TutorMate program started serving students in cities including London, Leeds, Doncaster, and Brandford in 2018. International expansion also includes Canada when Innovations for Learning Canada launched that same year, starting in Ontario. Prior to the 2018 expansion of international operations, Innovations for Learning also served schools in countries including Mexico, Korea, the Philippines, Rwanda, Uganda, and Sri Lanka.

A grant from the TELUS Friendly Future Foundation in Canada helped expand programming to indigenous children in Ontario and British Columbia.  The supported expansion included School District 60: Peace River North and Tia-o-qui-aht First Nation on Vancouver Island.  Also in Canada, Symcor sponsored an e-story book series written and illustrated by Indigenous artists with storylines designed to support language revitalization and advance priorities, perspectives, and world views of the Indigenous communities.

Combatting COVID-19 learning loss 
Funding from the Janus Henderson Foundation to combat learning loss caused by the global pandemic helped Innovations for Learning ensure an additional 300 students in the United Kingdom received in-home tutoring. Plus, Janus Henderson's grant provided support to expand high dosage tutoring in the Denver Public Schools.

The North Chicago School District #187 launched high dosage tutoring with Innovations for Learning to catch up students who had fallen behind in beginning reading due to COVID-19 school closures. Interventionists began working virtually with district kindergartners and first graders along with their families at the start of the 2020–21 academic year when schools went remote.

A partnership with the global manufacturing company Laitram developed a pilot program called "Ready-Set-Read!" for the manufacturing company's employees and their families to combat the education disruption caused by COVID-19.

References

Non-profit organizations based in Illinois
Educational organizations based in Illinois
Educational organizations established in 1993
1993 establishments in Illinois